The 2012 Chinese Football Association Division Two League season is the 23rd season since its establishment in 1989. It is divided into two groups, North and South. There are total 26 teams participating in the league with 13 teams in each group. The league is made up of two stages, the group stage and the play-off. The Group Stage is a double round-robin format. Each team in the group will play the other teams twice, home and away. It will start on April 20 and end on September 28. The Play-off Stage is a two-legged elimination. It will start in October. At the end of the season, the two finalists of the Play-off will qualify for promotion to 2013 China League One.

Team Changes

Promotion and relegation
Harbin Songbei Yiteng as the 2011 season champion and Chongqing F.C. as runner-up earned promotion to the 2012 China League One. The 3rd-placed team Fujian Smart Hero was also promoted to 2012 China League One after winning the play-off match against Guizhou Zhicheng, who finished in last place in the 2011 China League One.

Guizhou Zhicheng were relegated from 2011 China League One to 2012 China League Two South Group as the last placed team after losing the play-off match against the 3rd-placed team of 2011 China League Two Fujian Smart Hero.

Name Changes

Sichuan Dujiangyan Symbol moved to Xi'an in January 2012 and changed their name to Shaanxi Daqin.

New entries
There are 15 new teams participating in 2012 China League Two. They are Beijing Youth, Beijing Sangao, Beijing Yitong Kuche, Hebei Youth, Jiangsu HHU, Qinghai Senke, Shaanxi Laochenggen, Shanxi Jiayi, Xinjiang Begonia, Chongqing Youth, Hubei China-Kyle, Jiangxi Liansheng, Kunming Ruilong, Shenzhen Fengpeng and Shenzhen Main Sports.

Tianjin Huochetou did not participate in 2011 China League Two. They had participated in 2010 China League Two North Group and qualified for the Play-off First Round as the 3rd-placed team in the group. However  they were defeated by Guizhou Zhicheng F.C. in the Play-off First Round and failed to gain promotion to 2011 China League One.

Clubs

Group Stage Standings

North Group

South Group

Group Stage Results

North Group

South Group

Play-offs

Quarter-finals

First leg

Second leg

Semi-finals

First leg

Second leg

Third-place play-off

First leg

Second leg

Final

First leg

Second leg

Top scorers

League Attendance

North Group

There is no attendance data for Round 1, 2, 8, 13, 15, 18, 22, 23 and 24.

South Group

There is no attendance data for Round 13 and 23.

References

External links
Official site 
News and results at Sohu.com 

3
China League Two seasons